Billy McBryde (born 24 October 1996) is a Welsh rugby union player. A fly-half, although he has previously played centre too, he plays for the Doncaster Knights. His father is former Wales international hooker Robin McBryde.

McBryde made his debut as an 18 year old for Llanelli, as a substitute against Cross Keys. A year and a half later, he made his Scarlets debut, as a substitute in Scarlets' 44-21 drubbing of Bath in the Anglo-Welsh Cup.

He was selected in the Wales U20 for the 2016 Six Nations Under 20s Championship. His debut came in the opening game against Scotland U20. McBryde came on in the 79th minute, and immediately scored a penalty to win the game for Wales. He was selected again for the 2016 World Rugby Under 20 Championship, and made a further 3 appearances for the U20s.

References 

1996 births
Living people
Rugby union players from Carmarthen
Welsh rugby union players
Rugby union fly-halves